Skull Disco was an independent dubstep record label, based in Bristol, England. It was established in 2005 by Sam Shackleton and Laurie "Appleblim" Osborne, and ended in 2008. Releases on the label prominently featured African and post-African percussion, as well as "ethnic" samples. Zeke Clough contributed distinctive artwork for the label, drawing on both Egyptology and heavy metal imagery.

History
In 2004, prior to the founding of the label, Ian Hicks of Mordant Music liked and released an early Shackleton track entitled "Stalker". The track later appeared on Rough Trade Records Best of 2004 compilation. Around this time, Shackleton was becoming more familiar with the dubstep sound, through regular visits to the Forward>> nights run by Ammunition Promotions. He especially identified with the sound later associated with the DMZ nightclub, citing Loefah's Horror Show and Digital Mystikz Conference as key early influences, and started thinking about forming a label to release similar "interesting bass music"  and "interesting percussive stuff".

On a visit to a similarly-minded night in Bath, Shackleton encountered Laurie 'Appleblim' Osborne. Shackleton was impressed with a track, Mystikal Warrior, and it hence appeared on the first Skull Disco release; a double A-side, with Shackleton's I Am Animal on the flipside. Shortly after, Shackleton began the (now defunct) Skull Disco nights in London. Attendees at the first Skull Disco night included Coki and Mala of Digital Mystikz.

In November 2007, Appleblim established a sublabel, Applepips.

In 2008, Appleblim was chosen to mix the sixth installment of the Dubstep Allstars series on Tempa, which was released on 3 June 2008. Later in 2008, Shackleton and Appleblim parted ways with the label Skull Disco to release a second CD compilation after ten releases with Skull Disco, a number which Appleblim said "felt right".

Sound
Releases on the Skull Disco label were typically double A-sides, featuring a track apiece from Shackleton and Appleblim; however two compilations (Soundboy Punishments and Soundboy's Gravestone Gets Desecrated by Vandals) were also released.

Skull Disco releases often tended to use unusual sounds, atypical of the dubstep genre. Eschewing the familiar drum tropes of dubstep, tracks would be based on African percussion and samples of ethnic vocals, combined with massive, wobbling sub-bass, and sometimes elements of four to the floor, Basic Channel-style dub techno. Some tracks (particularly later Shackleton releases) bear a resemblance to the music of Muslimgauze . Minimal techno producer Ricardo Villalobos is a fan; he produced a nearly twenty-minute remix of Shackleton's Blood on my Hands after expressing an interest and being handed the core samples of the song at a DJ set. Shackleton has returned the favour by remixing Minimoonstar from Villalobos' Vasco EP Part 1.

According to journalist Derek Walmsley,

Artwork
Typical artwork on releases (by Zeke Clough ) was also of an idiosyncratic nature, the pen-and-ink covers referencing egyptological symbols as well as displaying a decidedly metal influence.

Discography
12": A. Shackleton - "I Am Animal" / AA. Appleblim - "Mystikal Warrior" (SKULL001)
12": A. Shackleton - "Majestic Visions" AA. Appleblim - "Cheat I" AA2. "Girder" (SKULL002)
EP: Soundboy's Nuts Get Ground Up Proper A. Shackleton - "Blood on my Hands" B1. Shackleton - "Naked" B2. Shackleton - "Hypno Angel" (SKULL003)
12": Soundboy's Bones Get Buried In The Dirt Vol 1 - A. Shackleton - "Tin Foil Sky" AA. Gatekeeper - "Tomb" (SKULL004)
12": Soundboy's Bones Get Buried In The Dirt Vol 2 - A. Appleblim - "Fear" AA. Shackleton - "Hamas Rule" (SKULL005)
12": Soundboy's Ashes Get Chopped Out And Snorted - A. Appleblim - "Vansan" AA. Shackleton - "You Bring Me Down" (SKULL006)
12": Shackleton - "Blood On My Hands (Ricardo Villalobos Apocalypso Now Mix)" (SKULL007)
2CD: Skull Disco - Soundboy Punishments (compilation album) (SKULLCD001)
EP: Appleblim And Peverelist - Soundboy's Ashes Get Hacked Up And Spat Out In Disgust (SKULL008)
12" Shackleton feat Vengeance Tenford - "Death Is Not Final" / "Death is Not Final (T++ remix)" (SKULL009)
12" Shackleton - Soundboy's Suicide Note (SKULL010)
CD Shackleton & Appleblim - Soundboy's Gravestone get Desecrated by Vandals (Compilation album)

References

British independent record labels
Dubstep record labels